In Plato's The Republic, a noble lie is a myth or a lie knowingly propagated by an elite to maintain social harmony. Plato presented the noble lie (γενναῖον ψεῦδος, gennaion pseudos) in the fictional tale known as the myth or parable of the metals in Book III. In it, Socrates provides the origin of the three social classes who compose the republic proposed by Plato. Socrates speaks of a socially stratified society as a metaphor for the soul, wherein the populace are told "a sort of Phoenician tale":

Socrates proposes and claims that if the people believed "this myth...[it] would have a good effect, making them more inclined to care for the state and one another." This is his noble lie: "a contrivance for one of those falsehoods that come into being in case of need, of which we were just now talking, some noble one..."

Criticism
The concept of the noble lie as defined by Plato has sparked controversy among modern interpreters. Although some earlier classical scholars including Francis Cornford argued that "noble lie" was a mistranslation,  Allan Bloom argued for a literal translation and interpretation of Plato's expression:

Karl Popper

In The Open Society and Its Enemies, Karl Popper remarks, "It is hard to understand why those of Plato's commentators who praise him for fighting against the subversive conventionalism of the Sophists, and for establishing a spiritual naturalism ultimately based on religion, fail to censure him for making a convention, or rather an invention, the ultimate basis of religion." Religion for Plato is a noble lie, at least if we assume that Plato meant all of this sincerely, not cynically. Popper finds Plato's conception of religion to have been very influential in subsequent thought.

Leo Strauss
Leo Strauss noted that thinkers of the first rank, going back to Plato, had raised the problem of whether good and effective politicians could be completely truthful and still achieve the necessary ends of their society. In The City and Man, Strauss discusses the myths outlined in Plato's Republic that are required for all governments. These include a belief that the state's land belongs to it even though it was likely acquired illegitimately and that citizenship is rooted in something more than the accidents of birth. By implication, Strauss asks his readers to consider whether it is true that noble lies have no role at all to play in uniting and guiding the polis. He questions whether myths are needed to give people meaning and purpose and whether they ensure a stable society in contrast to the more skeptical attitude which posits that men dedicated to the relentless examination of, in Nietzschean language, "deadly truths" can flourish freely, all the while concluding with an inquiry into whether there can be a limit to the political and epistemic absolutes.

See also

 Alternative facts
  
 Bokononism
 Fictionalism
 Lie-to-children
 Morality play
 Paternalism
 Paternalistic deception
 Plato's Laws
 Santa Claus
 Shendao teachings
 Pious fiction

References

Lying
Deception
Social concepts
Fiction
Religious studies
Political concepts